The 2006 Enfield Council election took place on 4 May 2006 to elect members of Enfield London Borough Council in London, England. The whole council was up for election and the Conservative party stayed in overall control of the council.

Election result
The Conservatives maintained a majority of 5 on the council, after losing 6 seats but also gaining 1 seat, to have 34 councillors. Labour made a net gain of 3 seats to have 27 councillors, while the remaining 2 seats were won by the Save Chase Farm group. Save Chase Farm had been formed to oppose any plans to close accident and emergency services at Chase Farm Hospital and gained 1 seat in each of Chase and Town wards. Overall turnout at the election was 37.91%.

Ward results

References

2006
2006 London Borough council elections